This is a list of shopping malls in the United Arab Emirates. This includes shopping malls/outlet malls that have various different shops from different brands, food courts and/or movie theatres.

Emirate of Abu Dhabi

Abu Dhabi

 Abu Dhabi Mall
 Al Mariah Mall
 Al Maqtaa Mall
 Al Raha Mall
 Al Wahda Mall
 Bawabat Al Sharq Mall
 Capital Mall (China Centre), Mussafah
 City Center Masdar, Masdar City
 Dalma Mall, Mussafah
 Deerfields Mall
 Forsan Central Mall, Khalifa City
 Khalidiyah Mall
 Madinat Zayed Shopping Center
 Marina Mall
 Mazyad Mall, Mussafah
 Mushrif Mall
 Nation Towers Mall
 Paragon Bay Mall, Al Reem Island
 Reem Mall, Al Reem Island
 Shams Boutik Mall, Al Reem Island
 The Galleria, Al Maryah Island
 The Mall, World Trade Center Abu Dhabi
 Yas Mall, Yas Island

Al Ain
 Al Ain Mall
 Al Foah Mall
 Al Jimi Mall
 Barari Outlet Mall
 Bawadi Mall
 Hili Mall
 Remali Mall

Ruwais 

 Ruwais Mall, Ruwais

Emirate of Ajman
 City Centre Ajman

 Grand Mall Ajman

Emirate of Dubai

 Madina Mall
 Dubai Mall
 Mall of the Emirates 
 Mirdif City Centre 
 Mercato Shopping Mall
 Dubai Festival City
 Arabian Centre
 Dubai Marina Mall
 BurJuman Mall
 Dubai Outlet Mall
 Deira City Center
 City Center Me'aisem
 Cityland Mall
 Galleria Mall (Jumeirah)
 Galleria Mall (Al Barsha)
 Times Square Center
 Dubai Hills Mall

Emirate of Sharjah
 Sharjah City Centre
 Sahara Centre
 Safeer Mall
 Rolla Mall
 Mega Mall
 Safari Mall
 Ansar mall 
 IMall 
 Al Zahya Mall
 Oasis Mall
 Grand Mall

Ras Al Khaimah

 RAK Mall
 Manar Mall
 AlNaeem Mall
 City Centre Al Dhait

Umm Al Quwain

 Mall of UAQ
 China Mall UAQ
 City Mall

Fujairah

 Fujairah Mall
 City Centre Fujairah
 Century Mall Fujairah

Future malls
 Mall of Arabia
 SM City Dubai
 Dubai Square
 Meydan One Mall

References

External links
 UAE shopping malls and centers
 City Centre Me'aisem - shopping mall near IMPZ

United Arab Emirates
Shopping malls